The Defense Contract Management Agency (DCMA) is an agency of the United States federal government reporting to the Under Secretary of Defense for Acquisition and Sustainment. It is responsible for administering contracts for the Department of Defense (DoD) and other authorized federal agencies. Its headquarters is located at Fort Lee, Virginia. DCMA sometimes handles Foreign Military Sales contracts.

History
Contract administration within DoD has been studied and modified for many years. In the early 1960s, a study was commissioned by the Secretary of Defense to examine the entire DoD contracting process. Known as "Project 60," the findings pointed to numerous benefits of consolidating contract administration and audit. At that time, each defense agency and military service was administering and auditing its own contracts, which resulted in a great amount of duplicate effort. Many of the contract administration responsibilities were eventually moved to the Defense Logistics Agency (DLA). However, the military services continued to retain oversight of the major weapon systems acquisition programs.

Defense Contract Management Command
The contract administration process was again reviewed in 1989. Citing continued problems with the manner in which the services were administering contracts, a Defense Management Review Decision (DMRD) 916 recommended the establishment of a joint command to administer defense contracts, to ensure that consistent policies and standards were applied to the defense acquisition process. DCMC was established as a command within the Defense Logistics Agency in February 1990 to satisfy the findings of DMRD 916.

DCMC transition to DCMA
On March 27, 2000, DCMC was renamed as the Defense Contract Management Agency and established independently from DLA. In DoD Directive 5105.64, the Deputy Secretary of Defense formally established the mission, responsibilities and functions of DCMA; save for 18 specific exceptions detailed in the Defense Federal Acquisition Regulation Supplement, DoD activities normally delegate a wide variety of contract administration functions to DCMA.

The DCMA headquarters moved from a northern Virginia location to Fort Lee, Virginia, as part of the federal 2005 Base Realignment and Closure process. The new headquarters was dedicated as Herbert Homer Hall on September 15, 2011. Homer was a DCMA employee killed in the September 11, 2001 terrorist attacks.

According to the DoD's Fiscal Year 2015 Budget Estimate, DCMA had 10,637 civilian and 472 military personnel, located in 
over 740 locations, managing over 19,000 contractors and nearly 350,000 active contracts. The operations and maintenance budget estimate for fiscal year 2015 was approximately $1.3 billion. By 2019, those numbers changed slightly. As of 14 January 2019, DCMA had 11,641 civilians and 552 military assigned. Number of contractors and number of active contracts remained roughly constant. Total contracts serviced were valued at $5.2 trillion and authorized contractor payments per day was valued at $678 million.

DCMA Seal, Badge, and Lapel Pin

The DCMA Seal is pictured above. The eagle represents courage, honor, and dedicated service to the United States, represented by the shield of thirteen pieces. The thirteen pieces of the shield represent the original thirteen colonies that became the first thirteen states. The thirteen pieces are joined together by the blue chief, representing Congress. The eagle is clutching thirteen arrows and an olive branch with thirteen leaves and thirteen olives, similar to the Great Seal of the United States. The eagle is superimposed atop a map of the world, representing DCMA's global mission. The rays emanating from the center to the thirteen stars represent glory. The color blue matches the canton of the American flag and signifies vigilance, perseverance, and justice. The circle shape and blue color are also reminiscent of the official seal of the Department of Defense.

In 2018, DCMA and the military services (the US Army, US Navy, US Air Force, and US Marine Corps—as the US Space Force did not exist in 2018) approved a duty badge for military personnel to wear while assigned to DCMA. A similar lapel pin version is also available for civilian employees (and military not in uniform). The badge and lapel pin were designed by The Institute Of Heraldry (TIOH), working at the direction of military officers assigned to DCMA. Those officers directed the badge and lapel pin be reminiscent of the DCMA Seal and they wrote the heraldry of the Seal (above) as part of the badge/pin approval process. Then-Director of DCMA, United States Air Force Lieutenant General Wendy M. Masiello approved the badge and pin for DCMA. Ultimately, TIOH approved the badge and pin as an official insignia for the US military and the individual Services approved the badge for wear on military uniforms.

List of DCMA Directors
 Air Force Maj. Gen. Timothy P. Malishenko , March 2000
 Army Brig. Gen. Edward Harrington, ~April 01,2001
 Air Force Maj. Gen. Darryl A. Scott, 2003
 Keith Ernst, 2006 Senior Executive Service (United States)
 Charlie Williams Jr., 2008 Senior Executive Service
 Air Force Lt. Gen. Wendy M. Masiello, June 6, 2014
 Navy Vice Adm. David H. Lewis, May 4, 2017
 Army Lt. Gen. David G. Bassett, June 4, 2020-present

References

External links

Defense Contract Management Agency

Contract Management Agency
Government agencies established in 2000